Beaver Valley Ski Club is a private skiing and snowboarding club located in Beaver Valley, Ontario, Canada.

It is situated on a steep sided section of the Niagara Escarpment adjacent to the Bruce Trail. It features some of the steepest runs and most diverse terrain in the region. The Club has 28 trails, five snowparks including a championship snowboard/ski cross course, national level mogul and slopestyle runs, glade skiing and a steep, groomed ski bowl. Its Playground snow park is one of the longest full featured snow park runs in Ontario. The Club has six lifts, two lodges and a ski and snowboard shop with rentals.

The Club hosts various national and international series snowboard and freestyle ski events: annual Beaver Valley Banked Slalom (part of the World Snowboard Banked Slalom Tour), annual Mogulmania (ski and snowboard), Beaver Valley Park Brawl (snowboard park), 2016 Canadian Junior Freestyle Ski Championship featuring slopestyle, moguls, big air and aerials events, 2016 and 2017 International Burton Qualifier Series (snowboard park)  and 2022 Snowboard Nor-Am Cup Slopestyle, Big Air and Snowboard Cross.

Beaver Valley Ski Club has won two Sustainable Slopes awards from the National Ski Areas Association. Beaver Valley is the only Canadian snow resort to be awarded a Sustainable Slopes Award.

The mogul skiing scenes of the 2017 film Molly's Game were filmed at Beaver Valley Ski Club.

Beaver Valley Ski Club was featured on the cover of Snowboard Canada Magazine's 2018 Fall issue.

Beaver Valley Ski Club was nominated for Best Terrain Park Feature 2018 and Best Terrain Park Event 2018 and 2019 in Ski Area Management Magazine's annual Terrain Park Contest. The Beaver Valley Banked Slalom was nominated for Ski Area Management Magazine's Best Terrain Park Event 2022.

History 
The genesis of Beaver Valley Ski Club dates back to the 1930s as Ontario’s first ski destination, serviced by a weekend “ski train” running from the City of Toronto to the Town of Flesherton. In 1936 Beaver Valley hosted the Dominion of Canada National Ski Championship organized by the Toronto Ski Club. Seventy competitors from across Canada competed in downhill and slalom racing.

In 1949 Beaver Valley Ski Resort was formally created with the installation of Canada’s longest rope tow. In the 1961 the Ontario Hydro Ski Club built at chalet at the bottom of Beaver Valley Resort. In 1962 the Austrian Ski Club built at chalet at the top of Beaver Valley Ski Resort. In 1963 Beaver Valley Resort was the first in Ontario to install floodlit night skiing.

In 1967 Beaver Valley Resort transitioned to its present day status as a member-funded Club to help further its development. In 1970 Beaver Valley Ski Club expanded its terrain with the addition of the south facing Avalanche Bowl creating Ontario's steepest, sustained pitch. In 1978 the Mogulmania event was created to showcase the bowl’s expert terrain and support the growing popularity of freestyle skiing. Mogulmania continues as Canada’s longest running mogul contest. In 1984 the Club further expanded its terrain with the addition of the South Bowl providing six more runs, including “Free-fall”, Ontario’s only FIS-recognized World Cup moguls course.

In 1990 Beaver Valley Ski Club introduced snowboarding in response to growing interest from its members. In 1993 Beaver Valley snowboarders Paul Chapman and Vince Jorgenson finished first and second, respectively, at the Canadian National Snowboard Championship. Paul Chapman won the overall title at the 1994 Junior World Snowboard Championship.

In 1994 Beaver Valley Ski Club installed Ontario’s first FIS-homologated Freestyle Ski Aerials training site. In 2002 Beaver Valley skier Veronica Brenner won the silver medal in the Women’s Freestyle Ski Aerials event at the Salt Lake City Winter Olympics.

In 2005 Beaver Valley Ski Club created Ontario’s longest, dedicated snow park run to support the growing popularity of slope style, big air, rail, and park snowboarding and skiing. Beaver Valley Snow Parks were featured in a 2012 national edition of SBC Skier Magazine and a 2018 edition of Snowboard Canada Magazine. In 2018 Beaver Valley Snow Parks were featured in the snowboard film May Flowers presented by Vans. In 2018 In 2018 Beaver Valley snowboarder Jasmine Baird was selected to the Canadian National Snowboard Slopestyle and Big Air Team.

In 2018 Beaver Valley Ski Club published a hard cover book commemorating and chronicling the first 50 years of its history.

In 2022 Beaver Valley snowboarder Jasmine Baird finished 7th in Big Air and 15th in Slope style at the Beijing 2022 Winter Olympics. Jasmine Baird won the gold medal at the 2022 World Cup Big Air at Edmonton's Commonwealth Stadium.

In 2022 Beaver Valley snowboarders Michael Nazwaski and Jamie Behan were selected to the Canadian National Alpine Snowboard Next Gen Team. In 2022 Beaver Valley skier Berkley Brown was selected to the Canadian National Moguls Next Gen Team.

In 2022 Beaver Valley snowboarder Jesse Jarrett was featured in the snowboard film Through My Fingers. In 2022 Beaver Valley snowboarder Chris Fellner was featured in the snowboard film Screaming About Nothing.

References

External links 

 Official website

Ski areas and resorts in Ontario
Grey County